Morgan Beadlescomb (born June 1, 1998) is an American middle-distance and long-distance runner currently representing Adidas.

Early Years 
Beadlescomb attended Algonac High School in Algonac, Michigan. He won the Lower Peninsula D2 Cross Country state finals in 2014 and 2015. On the track he was the 2015 and 2016 Lower Peninsula D2 state champions in the 1600 running 4:13 both years.After his senior year was awarded the Times Herald Male Runner of the Year.

Collegiate career 
After high school he attended Michigan State University for six years earning both a bachelors and a master's degree. He had lots of athletic success at Michigan State including a 3rd pace finish at the 2021 NCAA Indoor Championships in the 5000m, a 2nd-place finish at the 2022 NCAA Indoor Championships in the Mile, and another 2nd-place finish at the 2022 NCAA Championships in the 5000m. 

In February of 2022 Beadlescomb was a last minute entry into an indoor meet in Chicago where he broke his mile PR by over 9 seconds running 3:52.03 for the 4th fastest time in NCAA history. He finished behind the Oregon Alumni Duo of Cooper Teare and Cole Hocker.

Professional career 
In the late summer of 2022 Beadlescomb started training with Very Nice Track Club in Ann Arbor, Michigan under coach Ron Warhurst. On October 4th, 2022 he announced via an Instagram post that he had signed a contract with Adidas.

Personal Records

References 

Living people
1998 births
Track and field athletes from Michigan
American male long-distance runners
Sportspeople from Michigan
Michigan State University alumni
Michigan State Spartans athletes
Michigan State Spartans men's track and field athletes